Jamestown is a small village on a crossroads between Ballybrittas in County Laois and Monasterevin in County Kildare, in Ireland.

The local gaelic football team, Jamestown GAA, existed in Jamestown during the middle of the 20th century before fading out of existence in the 1960s.

References

Towns and villages in County Laois
Townlands of County Laois